As many as 25,000 Native Americans in World War II fought actively: 21,767 in the Army, 1,910 in the Navy, 874 in the Marines, 121 in the Coast Guard, and several hundred Native American women as nurses. These figures included over one-third of all able-bodied Native American men aged 18 to 50, and even included as high as seventy percent of the population of some tribes. The first Native American to be killed in WWII was Henry E. Nolatubby from Oklahoma. He was part of the Marine Detachment serving on the USS Arizona and went down with the ship on December 7, 1941. Unlike African Americans or Asian Americans, Native Americans did not serve in segregated units and served alongside white Americans.

Alison R. Bernstein argues that World War II presented the first large-scale exodus of Native Americans from reservations since the reservation system began and that it presented an opportunity for many Native Americans to leave reservations and enter the "white world." For many soldiers, World War II represented the first interracial contact between natives living on relatively isolated reservations.

Prewar
According to Bernstein, life on reservations was difficult for Native Americans prior to the war due to low levels of development and lack of economic opportunities. In 1939, the median income for Native American males living on reservations was $500, compared to the national average for males of $2300. Nearly one quarter of Native Americans had no formal education, and even for high school graduates, few forms of conventional employment existed on reservations. In the absence of conventional employment, those Native Americans who stayed on the reservations generally worked the land and farmed.

Although Native Americans were not drafted for World War I because they were not considered citizens of the United States in 1917, approximately 10,000 Native American men volunteered for duty in World War I.

Native American men were included along with whites in the World War II draft. Initial reactions by Native Americans to the draft were mixed. While some were eager to join the military, others resisted. Bernstein argues that their still-questionable status as citizens of the United States at the outbreak of the Second World War made many Native Americans question volunteering for military service since "the Federal government had the power to force Indians to serve in the military but did not have the power to compel Mississippi to grant Indians the vote." Although some resisted the draft, many others who were not drafted still volunteered for the war.

Native service
Against a background of the popular Hollywood image of the Native American warrior spirit in American popular culture, Native American men were generally regarded highly by their fellow soldiers, and their role appealed to the public. They first saw action in the Pacific Theater along with the rest of the US Army and Navy. The first known Native American casualty of war was a young Oklahoma man who died during the Japanese attack on Pearl Harbor.

Over the course of the war, Native American men fought across the world on all fronts, and were involved in many of the most critical battles involving American troops, including Iwo Jima—the site of Ira Hayes' triumphant moment in the famous photograph of Raising the Flag on Iwo Jima with five of his fellow Marines—the invasion of Normandy, the liberation of the Philippines, the Battle of the Bulge, the liberation of Paris, and the liberation of Belgium. Native Americans were also among the first Americans to enter Germany and played a role in the Battle of Berlin liberation of Berlin. Casualty reports showed Native Americans fighting as far away as Australia, North Africa, and Bataan. Native American soldiers were sometimes mistaken by white American soldiers for Japanese soldiers and taken prisoner or fired upon.

One of the most significant benefits that Native American men and women obtained from the war effort were the honors they received for serving including pow wows arranged prior to their deployment or upon their return. Another benefit were the new skills that could be gained that might lead to better jobs. Due to both the waning sense of isolation on reservations brought on by the war and the influx of money, Native Americans began to have access to consumer goods and services. The average Native American income increased to $2,500 by 1944, two-and-a-half times greater than in 1940. However, the average salary of a Native American was still only a quarter of the average salary of a white American.

More than 30 Native Americans were awarded the Distinguished Flying Cross, the third-highest aviation honor. Not counting the Purple Heart, more than 200 military awards were awarded to Native Americans. The most decorated Native American in the history of the United States Army is Pascal Poolaw, who, after World War II, went on the serve in the Korean War and the Vietnam War, earning a Distinguished Service Cross, four Silver Stars, five Bronze Stars, and three Purple Hearts. Although many Native Americans received recognition for their military service in terms of awards, these awards were later used during the termination period by the Bureau of Indian Affairs as proof that Native Americans were eager to assimilate into American culture.

Navajo code talkers project

In February 1942, a civilian named Philip Johnston came up with the idea of using the Navajo language as military code. Johnston, a missionaries' son, grew up on a reservation and understood the complexity of the Navajo language. By September 1942, the American government had recruited several hundred Native Americans who spoke both Navajo and English to translate English words into the Navajo language to foil enemy understanding. Often working behind enemy lines, the code talkers were commended for their bravery and gained respect from fellow soldiers. At its declassification in 1968, the code that these Navajo developed was the only oral military code that was not broken by an enemy.

The code itself was composed of carefully selected Navajo words that used poetic circumlocution so that even a Navajo-speaker would not be able to understand the communications without training. For example, since there were no words in Navajo for military machines, weapons, or foreign countries, so these words were substituted with words that did exist in the Navajo language. For example, Britain was spoken as "between waters" (toh-ta), a dive bomber was a "chicken hawk" (gini), a grenade was a "potato" (ni-ma-si) and Germany was "iron hat" (besh-be-cha-he).

In 2001, 28 Navajo Code Talkers were awarded Congressional Gold Medals, mostly posthumously. The group has also been commemorated in various media, including books, films, notably Windtalkers (2002) starring Nicolas Cage, Battle Cry starring Van Heflin, even a Navajo Code Talker GI Joe action figure.

Postwar
The war's aftermath, says Allison Bernstein, marked a "new era in Indian affairs" and turned "American Indians" into "Indian Americans."

Upon returning to the US after the war, some Native American servicemen and women suffered from post-traumatic stress disorder and unemployment. Following the war, many Native Americans found themselves living in cities, rather than on reservations. In 1940, only five percent of Native Americans lived in cities, but by 1950, the number had ballooned to nearly 20 percent.

Gallery

See also  
Apache Scouts - A division of the United States Army Indian Scouts
Arizona during World War II
Alaska Territorial Guard - A military reserve force known as the Eskimo Scouts
Charles Norman Shay - A Penobscot Maine tribal elder who served in World War II both as a master sergeant and a certified medical technician
Machita incident - A high-profile instance of resistance to the draft among Indians in southern Arizona
Windtalkers - A film depicting Navajo code talkers during the war
Native Americans in the American Civil War
Code talker

References

External links
 "Native Americans in World War II" article excerpt
 Shoshone in World War II
 Native Americans in the United States Army Portal at the United States Army Center of Military History

Military history of Native Americans
American military personnel of World War II
Military history of the United States during World War II
20th-century Native Americans